Thaumatoperla flaveola is a species of stonefly in the genus Thaumatoperla. They are endemic to the Mount Buller–Mount Stirling area of the Victoria alps, Australia.

Description
Medium-large insect.

As adult: Two pairs of wide, membranous wings. Anterior wings tawny-olive and mottled. Posterior wings deep grey. Head reddish-brown, with darker area in front. Legs dark-brown. The prothorax is yellow-brown, the mesothorax dark-brown, and the metathorax black. The cylindrical abdomen is slightly flattened dorsally and shiny black. Two large black cerci and two long black antennae.

They are incapable of flight.

Distribution
Thaumatoperla flaveola are endemic to the Mount Buller–Mount Stirling area of the Victoria alpine area in south-eastern Australia. They have not been recorded below 1100m.

Habitat
T. flaveola inhabit alpine riparian heathland. Nymphs live in the hyporheic zone of mountain streams.

Life history
T. flaveola emerge as adults in February - May.

Etymology
From Latin flāvus, referring to their yellowish colouring.

Conservation status
Listed as Threatened under the Flora and Fauna Guarantee Act 1988.

References

Aquatic insects
Plecoptera